Police Qaumi Razakars or Razakar (plu: Razakars) (Arabic for volunteer) is a volunteer police force in Punjab province,  Pakistan. Its duties include helping with the maintenance of law and order, by helping the police maintaining public security and natural calamities as may be prescribed.

There are currently 24,613 razakars with the Punjab police and their annual budget under TA head is Rs350 million and under uniform head Rs170m.

The force has been disband in Rawalpindi and several others districts over the complaints of corruption and misconduct of volunteers using the uniform to extort bribes and committing crimes like mobile and purse snatching.

See also
 Law enforcement in Pakistan

References 

Provincial law enforcement agencies of Pakistan